The 1992–93 Scottish Challenge Cup was the third season of the competition, which was also known as the B&Q Cup for sponsorship reasons, and was competed for by the 26 clubs in the Scottish Football League Division One and Two. The defending champions were Hamilton Academical, who defeated Ayr United 1–0 in the 1991 final.

The final was played on 13 December 1992, between Morton and Hamilton Academical at Love Street in Paisley. Hamilton Academical won 3–2, to defend the title for a second season.

Schedule

First round 
Albion Rovers, Brechin City, Raith Rovers, Stirling Albion, Clydebank and Queen of the South entered the second round.

Source: SFL

Second round 

Source: SFL

Quarter-finals

Semi-finals

Final

References

External links 
 Scottish Football League Scottish Challenge Cup on Scottish Football League website
 Soccerbase Scottish League Challenge Cup on Soccerbase.com
 ESPN Soccernet  Scottish League Challenge Cup homepage on ESPN Soccernet
 BBC Sport – Scottish Cups Challenge Cup on BBC Sport

Scottish Challenge Cup seasons
Challenge Cup
Scottish Challenge Cup